Michał Kubisztal (born 23 March 1980) is a Polish handball player for Czuwaj Przemyśl and a retired Polish national team player.

References

1980 births
Living people
Polish male handball players
Sportspeople from Tarnów